Butts Close is an  park in the town of Hitchin, Hertfordshire that used to once be a sporting ground for archery. The name refers to the archery butts that used to be on it during the Late medieval and Tudor times. During those years it was much larger but in the last centuries buildings such as a leisure centre and grammar school have been built on it. The remaining Butts Close is still used for modern fêtes and other special occasions though.

Facts and events
Henry VIII used to practice archery at Butts Close when he visited Hitchin.

Between WWI and WWII, on the north side of Butts Close there was sited a tank, allegedly "Fearless" but actually a different model from the real "Fearless," and a 16cm German Howitzer.  They were popular play areas for local children, but were taken away just before World War II and scrapped.

Parks and open spaces in Hertfordshire
Hitchin